The Stubb Cabinet was the 73rd Government of Finland, which stepped into office on 24 June 2014. It succeeded Jyrki Katainen's cabinet. The cabinet's prime minister was Alexander Stubb.

In September 2014, the Green League announced its departure from the cabinet after the majority of the cabinet voted to approve a new decision-in-principle for the Fennovoima nuclear project.

The portfolios held by Green League were divided between the leading National Coalition Party and the Social Democratic Party. Sirpa Paatero was chosen as the Minister for International Development and Sanni Grahn-Laasonen as Minister of the Environment.

After the Green party ceased their support for Stubb's government and left it, Stubb cabinet's strength was reduced to 101 out of 200 in the Eduskunta, which is a bare majority.

The Stubb Cabinet was succeeded by the Sipilä Cabinet headed by Centre Party leader Juha Sipilä on 29 May 2015.

Ministers 
The NCP had six ministers in the Cabinet as did the SDP. The Green League and the Swedish People's Party had two ministers each and the Christian Democrats had one.

|}

Environmental policy 

The Stubb Cabinet's environmental minister Sanni Grahn-Laasonen (kok.) cancelled the environmental program intended to protect the wetlands, instead favouring an approach based on voluntary protection. Former Minister of the Environment Ville Niinistö (vihr.) criticised the decision. The Greens left the cabinet following the cabinet's decision to back the Hanhikivi nuclear power plant with ties to Russian state-owned Rosatom.

See also
Politics of Finland

References

Stubb
2014 establishments in Finland
2015 disestablishments in Finland
Cabinets established in 2014
Cabinets disestablished in 2015